The Conservatório Dramático e Musical de São Paulo (Musical and Dramatic Conservatory of São Paulo) was a conservatory for students of music in São Paulo, Brazil.

The Conservatory was founded on February 15, 1906, and inaugurated officially on March 12 of that year.  In 1909 it moved to its last location on Avenida São João, downtown. Between 1981 and 1983 the building was renovated.

One of many post-secondary music schools in São Paulo, the Conservatory i
was known chiefly for its library of musical and dramatic scholarship, and its most famous alumnus, poet and musicologist Mário de Andrade, who studied piano and taught there for much of his life.

In 2009, due to many financial problems, the conservatory was closed. Its building will be a part of a new construction, the "Praça das Artes" (Art Square), which will be occupied by the artistic bodies of the Municipal Theater, its Schools of Music and Ballet, its museum and its technical center.

External links
Official website

Drama schools in Brazil
Music schools in Brazil